Rhuma argyraspis is a moth of the family Geometridae first described by Oswald Bertram Lower in 1893. It is found in Australia, including Queensland.

The wingspan is about 30 mm. Adult are grey with a number of dark zigzag stripes across each wing.

The larvae feed on Eucalyptus species, including Eucalyptus odorata. All instars, except the first, are yellowish olive-green, shading to pinkish or reddish brown laterally and ventrally, and maturing with brown dorsal markings. The resting posture of the larvae is rigid, straight and stick like.

References

Pseudoterpnini
Moths of Australia
Moths described in 1893